The Tipperary Heritage Way is a long-distance trail in County Tipperary, Ireland. It is typically completed in two days. It is designated as a National Waymarked Trail by the National Trails Office of the Irish Sports Council and is managed by Tipperary County Council, South Tipperary Integrated Development Company and the Tipperary Heritage Way Committee. The trail was opened on 7 September 2002 by Michael Smith, Minister for Defence. 

Starting at the Vee Gap, near Clogheen, in the Knockmealdown Mountains, the trail follows the course of the River Suir to Cashel, via the towns and villages of Ardfinnan, Cahir and Golden. The route follows part of an ancient road, known as Saint Declan's Way, that connected Ardmore, County Waterford with Cashel. It passes various sites of historical interest such as Hore Abbey, Cahir Castle, Swiss Cottage before finishing at the Rock of Cashel.

References

External links
 Tipperary Heritage Way at IrishTrails.ie

Long-distance trails in the Republic of Ireland
Geography of County Tipperary
Tourist attractions in County Tipperary